Recuerdos is the debut studio album by Argentine rapper Nicki Nicole. It was released on November 8, 2019 via Dale Play Records. The album features artists such as Cazzu and Duki, and features Bizarrap's production on the song "Plegarias".

Background 
After the international impact she had with producer Bizarrap in his Music Sessions, which obtained the approval of other artists in the country such as Duki, Cazzu, Khea, among others. Nicole confirmed the existence of the album on November 5, 2019 in an Instagram story.

Promotion

Singles 
On April 26, 2019, Nicole released the first single from the album, "Wapo Traketero", the music video for the song was directed by Cecilia Sarmiento. After the release of the Music Sessions with producer Bizarrap, Nicole confirmed on Twitter that she would be releasing a new song on August 23, 2019.

"Años Luz" was released as the second single on August 23, its music video managed to reach the top of YouTube in Argentina setting a trend and managed to enter the top 40 of the Billboard Argentina Hot 100 chart.

On October 9, 2019, Nicole released the song "Fucking Diablo" as a third single, which also made her debut in the top 40 of the Argentina Hot 100.

On November 8, 2019, he released "Diva" as the fourth single in conjunction with the album. The video was directed by the renowned Argentine director Facundo Ballve with the production of Anestesia Audiovisual.

Track listing

Charts

Release history

References 

2019 debut albums
Nicki Nicole albums
Latin music albums by Argentine artists